Chongqing Subdistrict is a subdistrict in Chaoyang District, Changchun, Jilin province, China. , it has 4 residential communities under its administration.

See also 
 List of township-level divisions of Jilin

References 

Township-level divisions of Jilin
Changchun